Six ships of the Royal Navy have borne the name HMS Opossum, after the opossum:

 was a  launched in 1808 and sold in 1819.
 was a Cherokee-class brig-sloop launched in 1821 and sold in 1841.
 was an  wooden screw gunboat launched in 1856. She became a hospital hulk in 1876, and a mooring vessel in 1891. She was renamed HMS Siren in 1895 and was sold in 1896.
 was a  launched in 1895 and sold in 1920.
 was a  sloop launched in 1944 and broken up in 1960.
 was an  launched in 1963 and broken up in 1996.

References

Royal Navy ship names